August Georg Dinklage (3 September 184920 April 1920) was a German architect and building official.

Life
August Dinklage was born in  Oldenburg shortly after the conservative Grand Duchy of Oldenburg had been relatively lightly touched by the constitutional disturbances of 1848. Between 1872 and 1879 he studied at the Technical Academy (as it was then known) in Hannover, where he was taught by Conrad Wilhelm Hase. He then took a government job which among other things enabled him to gain early experience of ecclesiastical buildings.

In 1889 he resigned from government service in order to pursue a career as a freelance architect, moving to Berlin where between 1889 and 1901 he was working in partnership with Hans Grisebach under the name Grisebach und Dinklage. One of their last commissions together was the neogothic Schlesisches Tor (literally "Silesian Gate") Station in Berlin-Kreuzberg which was designed primarily by Dinklage.

In 1901 Grisebach resigned from their partnership, and Dinklage took , till then an employee of the firm, as his new partner. The firm was reconfigured as Dinklage und Paulus. In 1916 it was August Dinklage, now aged 66, who retired from the partnership. During the Dinklage und Paulus years the partnership was responsible for several new churches in Berlin.

He died in Berlin.

Works
 1891–1893:  in Gießen (with Hans Grisebach and Richard Schultze)
 1891–1894:  in Frankfurt am Main (with Hans Grisebach)
 1894–1896: Seßwegen Palace in Cesvaine (with Hans Grisebach)
 1897–1898:  in Liberec (with Hans Grisebach)
 1898:  in Klink (with Hans Grisebach)
 1900–1901: Silesian Gate Station in Berlin (with Hans Grisebach)
 1904:  in Berlin (with Ernst Paulus)
 1905–1906:  in Moabit, Berlin (with Ernst Paulus)
 1905–1907:  in Berlin (with Ernst Paulus, based on designs by Ernst Schwartzkopff)
 1908:  in Prenzlauer Berg, Berlin (with Ernst Paulus and Olaf Lilloe)
 1909–1910:  in Berlin (with Ernst Paulus)
 1909–1912:  in Moabit, Berlin (with Ernst Paulus and Olaf Lilloe)
 1910:  in Berlin (with Ernst Paulus)
 1911:  in Berlin (with Ernst Paulus and Olaf Lilloe)

References

Architects from Berlin
Corps students
1849 births
1920 deaths